Artistes 311 Love Beyond Borders was a major fund raising campaign held in Hong Kong for the victims of the Japan 2011 Tōhoku earthquake and tsunami.  The event was organized by the Hong Kong Performing Artistes Guild and began at 7pm on  1 April 2011 at Causeway Bay Victoria park.  About HK$18 million were raised in this event alone, not counting other fund raisers. Converted into US Dollars, the charity concert raised approximately 2.31 million dollars.

Preparation
The name of the event 311 came from 11 March, the day that the earthquake occurred.  The concert event lasted 3 hours featuring 300 local and overseas artists, including some from Japan.  There were about 8,000 to 10,000 people in attendance.  Japan's consul general Yuji Kumamaru and his wife also attended and sat in the front row seat.  On 24 March about 100 celebrities at RTHK recorded the theme song "Succumb not to sorrow" (不要輸給心痛).

Broadcast
More than 150 donation hotlines were available.  The event was telecasted live.  Broadcast was available on major stations in HK, People's Republic of China, Taiwan, Malaysia, Singapore, Japan.  Event was hosted by Eric Tsang, Lawrence Cheng, Carol Cheng, Sylvia Chang, Agnes Chan.

Participants
The following are some of the participants at the concert.  The list is incomplete.

Other similar event
On 20 March 2011 a much smaller scale fund raising campaign called "全城關愛日本大地震" was held in HK. Many of the participants have also worked closely in Japan's industry.  Participants include:

See also
 Fight and Smile
 Artistes 512 Fund Raising Campaign

References

External links
 Official site
 晚會無綫電視網頁
 《愛心無國界 311燭光晚會》 官方主題曲MV—「無懼風雨」(Japanese version)

Music festivals in Hong Kong
2011 Tōhoku earthquake and tsunami relief
Benefit concerts
2011 in Hong Kong